Dorimachus was an Aetolian general who took an active part in the Social War (220–217 BC).

External sources
Smith's Dictionary

Ancient Aetolians